The MBC Gayo Daejejeon is an annual, end-of-the-year South Korean music show broadcast by the Munhwa Broadcasting Corporation (MBC). The event was first held in 1966 as a singing competition, but MBC stopped giving out awards in 2005.

History
The event was first held in 1966 as the MBC Ten Singers Match (Hangul: MBC 10대 가수 청백전). It was a competition among ten singers, with the winner being awarded the "King of Ten Singers." It was broadcast live on MBC radio from the Seoul Citizens Hall. The event was broadcast on television starting in 1970.

In 1972, the Seoul Citizens Hall caught on fire at the end of that year's MBC Ten Singers Match. About 1,500 people were still inside the venue as the fire spread. Ultimately, 53 people were killed by the fire, and several of the singers in attendance that night were injured.

In 2005, MBC stopped giving out awards at the event after it was boycotted by numerous artists in 2004. The event was renamed the MBC Gayo Daejejeon in 2005.

Im Yoon-ah has been the host since 2015.

Award winners (1966-2005)

Best Popular Singer

Best Popular Song

Popular Singer Award / Top 10 Singer Award 
This award was called the Popular Singer Award from 1998 to 2001, and the Top 10 Singer Award from 2002 to 2004.

New Singer Award

Music festival (2015–present)

2015
The 2015 MBC Gayo Daejejeon was held on 31 December, hosted by Girls Generation's YoonA & Kim Sung-joo

Performers:

Lovelyz
Red Velvet
MAMAMOO
Girls' Generation
Ailee
G-Friend
Wonder Girls
INFINITE
A Pink
AOA
B.A.P
BTOB
BTS
B1A4
CNBLUE
EXO
GOT7
MONSTA X
SHINee
TEEN TOP
VIXX
2PM
4minute
J.Y. Park
Baek Ji Young
Seventeen
SONAMOO
Shin Seung Hoon
Oh My Girl
Tae Jin Ah
Hong Jin Young
Dynamic Duo x Crush
UP10TION
Zion.T

2016
The 2016 MBC Gayo Daejejeon was held on 31 December, hosted by Girls Generation's YoonA & Kim Sung-joo

Performers:

EXO 
Taeyeon 
SHINee
INFINITE 
BTS 
CNBLUE 
Apink 
B1A4 
AOA 
B.A.P 
EXID 
BTOB 
VIXX 
GOT7 
Red Velvet 
MAMAMOO 
SEVENTEEN 
GFRIEND
Twice 
MONSTA X 
UP10TION
 TURBO(터보)

2017
The 2017 MBC Gayo Daejejeon was held on 31 December, hosted by EXO's Suho, Girls Generation's YoonA & Astro's Cha Eun-woo.

Performers:

EXO
BTS
Red Velvet
Twice
Wanna One
WINNER
VIXX
EXID
BTOB
B.A.P
MAMAMOO
SECHSKIES
Lovelyz
MONSTA X
GFriend
PRISTIN
Cosmic Girls
SEVENTEEN
ASTRO
NCT 127
Teen Top
GOT7
Zion.T
Sunmi
HyunA
Hwang Chi Yeul
No Brain
Bolbbalgan4
Urban Zakapa
Seenroot

2018: The Live
The 2018 MBC Gayo Daejejeon was held on 31 December, and hosted by Noh Hong Chul, Girls Generation's YoonA, Shinee's Minho & Astro's Cha Eun-woo.

Performers:

Apink
BTOB
BTS
EXO
GOT7
iKON
MONSTA X
NCT Dream
Now United
Stray Kids
The Boyz
Twice
Wanna One
WINNER
Golden Child
Gugudan
Norazo
TVXQ
Lovelyz
Red Velvet
MAMAMOO
Momoland
Vibe
Baek Ji-young
Ben
Bolbbalgan4
Bizzy
VIXX
Sunmi
Sunwoo Jung-a
SEVENTEEN
(G)I-dle
GFriend
Oh My Girl
Cosmic Girls
Yoon Mi-rae
Tiger JK
Hong Jin-young
Hwanhee

2019: The Chemistry
The 2019 MBC Gayo Daejejeon was held on 31 December, and was hosted by Jang Sung-kyu, Girls Generation's YoonA and Astro's Cha Eun-woo. The theme is the chemistry between idols who collaborate together.

Performers:

AOA
GOT7
ITZY
Monsta X
NCT Dream
NCT 127
Stray Kids
Twice
Guckkasten
Kyuhyun (Super Junior)
Kim Jae-hwan
Norazo
NU'EST
Lovelyz
Red Velvet
MAMAMOO
Sung Si-kyung
Seventeen
Celeb Five
Song Ga-in
Astro
(G)I-dle
Oh My Girl
Cosmic Girls
Lee Seok-hoon (SG Wannabe)
Jang Woo-hyuk (H.O.T.)
Chungha
Taemin (SHINee)
Hyuna
Dawn
Hong Jin-young

2020: The Moment
The 2020 MBC Gayo Daejejeon was held on 31 December, hosted by Jang Sung-kyu, Girls Generation's YoonA and Kim Seon-ho.

Performers:

Park Jin-young
Rain
Uhm Jung-hwa
Lim Young-woong
Mamamoo
NCT
Song Ga-in
Henry
Got7
Itzy
Stray Kids
Twice
Kang Seung-yoon (Winner)
Norazo
The Boyz
Kim Shin-young
(G)I-dle
Monsta X
Iz*One 
aespa
Oh My Girl
Loona
Top 4 singers from People of Trot (An Seong-jun, Kim So-yeon, Kim Jae-rong and Doubleless)
Jessi
Paul Kim

2021: Together
The 2021 MBC Gayo Daejejeon was on 31 December, at Ilhosted by Jang Sung-kyu, Girls Generation's Yoona and 2PM's Lee Junho.

Performers:

Yang Hee-eun
Kim Yeon-ja
YB
Norazo
Sunwoo Jung-a
10cm
Song Ga-in
Mamamoo
Red Velvet
Oh My Girl
Brave Girls
Astro
NCT 127
NCT Dream
NCT U
Lim Young-woong
Chani (SF9)
Kino (Pentagon)
The Boyz
Celeb Five
Aiki
Stray Kids
(G)I-dle (Miyeon, Soyeon)
Kim Min-ju
Hwanwoong (Oneus)
Itzy
Kim Dong-hyun (AB6IX)
STAYC
Aespa
Lee Mu-jin
MSG Wannabe
Ive
TAN
My Teenage Girl

2022: With Love
The 2022 MBC Gayo Daejejeon was hosted on December 31, by Jang Sung-kyu, Im Yoon-ah and Lee Jun-ho.

Performers:

Sumi Jo
Yoon Jong-shin
Jaurim
Koyote
Ryeowook (Super Junior)
Younha
Young Tak
10cm
Song Ga-in
Mamamoo
Arin (Oh My Girl)
Monsta X
Moonbin & Sanha (Astro)
NCT 127
NCT Dream
Yoo Taeyang (SF9)
Choi Yoo-jung (Weki Meki)
The Boyz
Forestella
Stray Kids
(G)I-dle
Lee Mu-jin
Chuu
Ateez
Itzy
Big Naughty
Jeong Dong-won
Be'O
Kim Yo-han (WEi)
Aespa
Billlie
Ive
Kep1er
Choi Ye-na
Nmixx
Tempest
Classy

Notes

See also
 Show! Music Core
KBS Song Festival
SBS Gayo Daejeon

References

MBC TV original programming
Annual events in South Korea
Winter events in South Korea